Ecodynamics is a part of applied economics. It covers knowledge on monetary value, the usage of money, and the money flow. It deals with labor, and capital.

See also 
 Thermoeconomics
 System Dynamics

External links
 M. King Hubbert on the Nature of Growth. Testimony to Hearing on the National Energy Conservation Policy Act of 1974, Subcommittee on the Environment of the committee on Interior and Insular Affairs House of Representatives, June 6, 1974.
 Herman E. Daly: Economics in a Full World, Scientific American, September 2005, Vol. 293, Issue 3.
 System Dynamics Society

References 
 

 
 
 

Monetary economics